State Route 300 (SR 300) is a short state highway in Mason County, in the U.S. state of Washington. It extends  from Belfair State Park to SR 3 in the community of Belfair. The route serves as a connector from Belfair State Park to Belfair and SR 3. The highway was Secondary State Highway 21C (SSH 21C) from 1957 until 1964.

Route description
SR 300 runs  from Belfair State Park to SR 3 in the community of Belfair. The route serves as a connector from Belfair State Park to Belfair and SR 3. WSDOT has found that more than 11,000 motorists utilize the road daily before the interchange with SR 3 based on average annual daily traffic (AADT) data.
SR 300 starts at the entrance to Belfair State Park west of Belfair. From the state park, the highway goes northeast along the coastline of the Hood Canal to Belfair, and turns south to merge onto SR 3.

History

When the Primary and Secondary Highways were realigned in 1957, the current SR 300 became Secondary State Highway 21C (SSH 21C). SSH 21C became SR 300 in 1964 during the 1964 highway renumbering, in which the Washington State Department of Transportation (WSDOT) replaced the previous system of Primary and Secondary Highways with a new system called State Routes, which is still in use today.

Major intersections

References

External links

Highways of Washington State

300
Transportation in Mason County, Washington